Aaron Connolly (born 16 July 1991) is a Scottish footballer who plays as a striker and caretaker manager for East Kilbride Thistle. He has previously played in the Scottish Championship for Ayr United.

Career
Connolly came through the pro youth set-up at Ayr United and made his Scottish Football League Division One debut against Ross County in January 2010. He had a brief loan spell at Annan Athletic in late 2010 before joining Junior side Girvan for the rest of the season.

Connolly went on to play for Cumnock Juniors, East Kilbride Thistle and Hurlford United. He joined Glenafton Athletic of the Scottish Junior Football Association, West Region, in August 2013.

In July 2015 Connolly joined Lowland League side BSC Glasgow, signing a two-year contract. He left the club in December 2015, following the departure of manager Craig Young, and joined East Kilbride.

In March 2016, Connolly joined East Kilbride Thistle on loan until the end of the 2015–16 season. He joined Irvine Meadow in July 2017.

He spent the 2019-20 season with Fauldhouse United.

Connolly was appointed caretaker manager in September 2022 following the departure of Garry O'Hanlon.

References

Living people
1991 births
Scottish footballers
Ayr United F.C. players
Annan Athletic F.C. players
Girvan F.C. players
Cumnock Juniors F.C. players
East Kilbride Thistle F.C. players
Hurlford United F.C. players
Glenafton Athletic F.C. players
Scottish Football League players
Scottish Junior Football Association players
Association football forwards